State highway spurs in Texas are owned and maintained by the Texas Department of Transportation (TxDOT).

Spur 300

Spur 300 is located in Nacogdoches.

Spur 300 was designated on October 28, 1993, from Old Lufkin Road south of Loop 224 eastward to US 59.

Spur 300 (1981)

The original Spur 300 was designated on December 14, 1981, from FM 521, 8.2 miles north of Angelton, south 1.6 miles to SH 288 along an old routing of SH 288. Spur 300 was cancelled on September 26, 1986, and transferred to SH 227 (now Business SH 288-B).

Spur 302

Spur 302 is located in Greenville. Its western terminus is at US 69 and US 380, and its eastern terminus is at I-30/US 67 at the east end. Mostly known as Lee Street, it runs through downtown as a one-way pair, with Lee Street going eastbound and Washington Street going westbound.

Spur 302 was designated on March 29, 1956, as Loop 302, connecting to US 67 at both termini, and signed as a business route of US 67. On December 14, 1960, the section along Wellington Street was cancelled, and the section east to SH 34 was also removed, as it was concurrent with SH 224. On June 21, 1990, Loop 302 was cancelled, and the designation was changed to Business US 67. On February 22, 2001, the route was redesignated Spur 302, which also replaced the section of SH 224 from SH 34 to US 69; the section of SH 224 that was concurrent with SH 34 was cancelled.

Junction list

Spur 303

Spur 303 is located in Tarrant and Dallas counties. It runs from I-820 to Loop 12. At 17.4 miles, Spur 303 is the longest spur in Texas.

Spur 303 was designated on February 23, 1956, from Rosedale Street (now I-820), south of the Texas & Pacific overpass at Handley, east along an old interurban rail line and along Park Row Street in Arlington to the then-proposed extension of SH 360. Three months later the road was extended east 3.9 miles to FM 1382. On March 7, 1969, the road was extended east 5.4 miles to Loop 12. On July 24, 1978, the section from SE 14th Street to the intersection of Florina Drive (now Mountain Creek Parkway) and Kiest Boulevard was cancelled.

Spur 309

Spur 309 is located in western Lubbock. It begins at an intersection with SH 114, with Research Boulevard continuing south through Hurlwood. The highway runs north for approximately  before ending at FM 2255, just south of Reese Center. Research Boulevard continues north before becoming a county dirt road.

On June 30, 1961, a  section at the northern terminus was returned to the base's jurisdiction.

Spur 309 (1956)

This route was cancelled on August 27, 1959, upon completion of construction, and jurisdiction was returned to the county per the original agreement.

Spur 310

Spur 310 was located in Presidio County. Spur 310 was cancelled on February 27, 2003.

Spur 311

Spur 311 was designated on February 25, 1975, from SH 121 in Bohnam northward on the old route of SH 121 to US 82.

Spur 312

Spur 312 is located in Parker County, running from I-20 to US 180 in Weatherford. It was designated on August 28, 1991, as part of the cancellation of US 80 west of Dallas.

Spur 312 (1956)

A previous route numbered Spur 312 was designated on August 17, 1956, from US 80 (now I-20) west of Abilene, south  to Abilene Air Force Base (now Dyess Air Force Base). Spur 312 was cancelled on August 18, 1987, by district request and transferred to FM 3438.

Spur 313

Spur 313 was located in Lubbock County. It was designated on November 20, 1997, from FM 1730 west  to US 62/US 82. Spur 313 was cancelled by district request on January 26, 2006, and returned to the cities of Lubbock and Wolfforth.

Spur 314

Spur 314 was designated on October 24, 1956, from SH 22 in Mertens southeast and southwest 0.2 mile to FM 308 along an old routing of FM 308. A portion of the route was originally Spur 56 from 1939 to 1948. On April 23, 1997, Spur 314 was cancelled and returned to the city of Mertens.

Spur 316

Spur 316 is located in Pottsboro.

Spur 316 was designated on December 17, 2009, from a part of FM 120, as the section north of SH 289 was transferred to SH 289, and FM 120 was rerouted over part of FM 996.

Spur 317

Spur 317 is located in Del Rio.
Spur 317 was designated on March 29, 1957, from US 277 southeast of Del Rio, northeastward to Laughlin Air Force Base. On June 26, 2008, the road was extended west to Loop 79, which was designated that day.

Spur 320

Spur 320 is a proposed spur located in El Paso.

Spur 324

Spur 324 is located in Tennessee Colony.

Spur 324 was designated on July 15, 1957, from US 287 westward along the old location of US 287 to FM 645 in Tennessee Colony.

Spur 325

Spur 325 is located in Wichita Falls. Southbound traffic on Spur 325 carries over to northbound US 287, and vice versa. It then has an interchange is with FM 890 (Airport Drive), with access to Wichita Falls Municipal Airport. The route's freeway status ends at Sheppard Access Road. Spur 325 ends at an intersection with SH 240. The roadway continues into Sheppard Air Force Base as Avenue D.

Spur 325 was designated on September 27, 1957, along the current route.

Spur 326

Spur 326 is located in central Lubbock. It is known locally as Avenue Q. It begins at an intersection with US 84 (Clovis Road/Avenue Q) just northwest of downtown Lubbock. The highway then crosses over a railyard and has an interchange with Avenue P before crossing Comancheria Lake. Spur 326 has an intersection with Erskine Street before ending at an interchange with I-27/US 87.

Spur 326 was designated on October 30, 1957, along the current route.

Spur 327

Spur 329

Spur 329 was designated on October 30, 1957, from US 83 at or near Harrison Avenue and an MP Railroad line in western Harlingen to US 77 at or near a then-present intersection of US 77 and Primera Road, east of the rail line. On June 1, 1967, Spur 329 was cancelled and redesignated as US 77.

Spur 330

Spur 331

Spur 331 is located in southeast Lubbock. The route starts at US 84, travels northwest, has an interchange with Loop 289, and ends at FM 835. The entire route is known as Southeast Drive.

Spur 331 was designated on October 30, 1957, on its current route.

Junction list

Spur 334

Spur 334 is located in Seymour. It was designated on August 24, 2006, when US 183/US 277/US 283 was rerouted onto a freeway bypass south and east of Seymour.

Spur 339

Spur 339 is located in Lufkin.

Spur 339 was designated on August 23, 1960, from SH 103 in Lufkin via Raquet Street to SH 94.

Spur 341

Spur 341 is located in eastern White Settlement. The highway is known locally as Lockheed Boulevard. Spur 341 was designated on September 26, 1960, on its current route, replacing SH 550 Spur.

Junction list

Spur 342

Spur 345

Spur 346

Spur 346 was designated on December 14, 1960, from US 87 in Port Lavaca to SH 35 near the west end of the Lavaca Bay Causeway along an old routing of SH 35. On January 13, 1980, Spur 346 was cancelled and transferred to SH 238.

Spur 347

Spur 347 is located in Downtown Fort Worth. It travels along a pair of one-way streets, with eastbound traffic traveling along Weatherford Street and westbound traffic traveling along Belknap Street.

Spur 347 begins at an intersection with Grove Street near the Trinity Campus of Tarrant County College. The highway travels in a northeast direction and intersects Pecan Street before crossing the Rock Island Line. Spur 347 continues to run in a northeast direction before ending at an interchange with I-35W/US 287/US 377/SH 121.

Spur 347 was designated on December 14, 1960, between SH 199 and I-35W along an old route of US 377. The section of highway between SH 199 and Grove Street was removed from the state highway system and turned over to the city of Fort Worth on March 29, 2007.

Spur 348

Spur 348 is located in Dallas County. It runs from SH 114 northwest of Dallas to I-35E.

Spur 348 was designated on February 22, 1961, from Loop 12/SH 183 north to I-35E just north of then-SH 114. On January 7, 1971, the route was transferred to Loop 12 when it was rerouted (the former route of Loop 12 became Spur 482) and Spur 348 was reassigned the same day to an old routing of SH 114 from SH 114 to Loop 12. On December 27, 1990, by district request, the road was extended north 0.5 mile to I-35E.

Spur 349

Spur 349 is located in Val Verde County County. It runs from US 90 west to the Amistad Dam and the U.S.–Mexico border at the Lake Amistad Dam International Crossing.

Spur 349 was designated on April 19, 1961, on its current route. The route was temporarily decommissioned from 1962 to 1969 and relinquished to International Boundary and Water Commission jurisdiction while the Amistad Dam was under construction.

Spur 350

Spur 350 was designated on April 19, 1961, from then-proposed SH 121 to SH 183 west of Amon Carter Airport. On August 29, 1979, Spur 350 was cancelled and replaced by a rerouted SH 183. The old route of SH 183 became SH 10.

Spur 351

Spur 351 was designated on June 30, 1961, from FM 25 (now SH 46) and FM 78 south to US 90A west of Seguin. On August 4, 1970, the road was extended 3 miles south to SH 123. On September 29, 1988, a 0.3 mile section from I-10 to FM 78 was transferred to SH 46. The remainder of Spur 351 was cancelled on May 14, 1990, and transferred to SH 46.

Spur 356

Spur 356 is located in Blanco County. It runs from US 290 in Johnson City to US 281.

Spur 356 was designated on March 29, 1962, on the current route when US 281 was rerouted.

Spur 357

Spur 357 is located in Knox County. It runs from US 277 in Goree to 1st Street.

Spur 357 was designated on July 26, 2007, on the current route when US 277 was rerouted.

Spur 359

Spur 359 was designated on June 26, 1962, in McKinney from then-new US 75 to then-US 75 (now SH 5). On August 25, 2016, Spur 359 was cancelled and returned to the city of McKinney.

Spur 364

Spur 365

Spur 365 was designated on June 26, 1962, near Brookshire (corrected to Hempstead three months later) from FM 359 and then-US 290 (now US 290 Business) north to then-proposed US 290 (now current US 290). On May 5, 1964, Spur 365 was cancelled and removed from the highway system as it was never built; the route became a portion of FM 359 in 1982.

Spur 366

Spur 371

Spur 376

Spur 376 was designated on March 26, 2020, from SH 195 and County Road 241 southeast to SH 195 along an old routing of SH 195.

Spur 377

Spur 377 was designated on March 26, 2020, from SH 195 north of County Road 239 southeast to SH 195 along an old routing of SH 195.

Spur 378

Spur 378 was designated on February 20, 1962, from US 259 in Kilgore west to SH 135 along an old routing of SH 135. On June 14, 1968, Spur 378 was cancelled and became a portion of SH 42.

Spur 379

Spur 379 (1963)

The original Spur 379 was designated on February 20, 1963, from US 81 (now Business I-35) in Alvarado northeast to then-new US 67 along an old routing of US 67. Spur 379 was cancelled on October 25, 1990, and transferred to Business US 67-N.

Spur 379 (2013)

Spur 379 was designated on February 28, 2013, from I-35 north of Round Rock to US 79 as a replacement of a portion of Business I-35-L. On March 26, 2020, Spur 379 was returned to the city of Round Rock. However, signage will not be taken down for several months.

Spur 380

Spur 380 is located in Jefferson County. It runs from I-10 to US 69/US 96/US 287 in Beaumont.

Spur 380 was designated on May 24, 1963, from US 90 in Beaumont, southeastward along old route of US 69/US 96/US 287 to the new route. On August 31, 1977, the road was extended northwest to I-10.

Spur 381

Spur 381 is located in Grayson County. It runs from US 75 to SH 5 in Howe.

Spur 381 was designated on April 17, 1963, on the current route.

Spur 383

Spur 383 was designated on April 18, 1963, in Burkburnett from then-relocated US 277 west along an extension of Glendale Street to then-US 277 (now SH 240). On May 30, 2002, Spur 383 was cancelled by district request and redesignated as SH 240.

Spur 386

Spur 386 was designated on August 1, 1963, in Jacksonville, from Frankston Street north to then-new US 69 along an old routing of US 69. On December 18, 2003, Spur 386 was cancelled by district request and redesignated as FM 347.

Spur 394

Spur 394 is located in Ellis County. It is proposed to run from FM 66 southwest of Waxahachie, eastward to Business US 287-R.

Spur 394 was designated on December 19, 1963, from I-35E south of Waxahachie to US 287 northeast of Waxahachie. On August 23, 1976, the road was extended east from old US 287 (which was designated as Loop 528 that day) to new US 287. On June 21, 1990, the constructed section from Loop 528 to US 287 became part of Business US 287-R (as well as Loop 528 itself), but it is signed as "TO US 287". On June 24, 1992, the road was extended west to FM 66.

Spur 397

Spur 397 is located in Palo Pinto County. It runs from FM 4 in Graford east to SH 254. It is signed at both termini as Business Loop 397.

Spur 397 was designated on April 24, 1964, on its current route. It is a former routing of SH 254 through Graford.

Spur 398

Spur 398 is located in Gray County. It begins at SH 273 south of Lefors and runs through the town to another point on SH 273 northeast of it.

Spur 398 was designated on June 4, 1964, from SH 273 near the south city limit of Lefors to another point on what was then SH 273 (now 2nd Street). On January 19, 1966, the road was extended north  over the former SH 273.

Spur 399

References

+3
State highway spurs 300
State highway spurs 300